Dubie may refer to:

People 
 Brian Dubie (born 1959), American politician
 Jeanine Dubié (born 1958), French politician
 Josy Dubié, Belgian politician
 Michael Dubie (born 1960), United States Air Force officer
 Norman Dubie (born 1945), American poet
 Wade Dubielewicz (born 1979), Canadian hockey player

Places 
 Dubie, Democratic Republic of the Congo
 Dubie, Lesser Poland Voivodeship, Poland
 Dubie, Łódź Voivodeship, Poland
 Dubie, Lviv Oblast, Ukraine